Whitten is an English surname and is associated with origins in Ireland and Scotland. Notable people with the name include:

 Benoni Whitten (died 1883), American attorney and judge from Oregon
 Bill Frank Whitten (1944–2006), Hollywood fashion designer 
 Bill Whitten, American songwriter and musician
 Cameron Whitten (born 1991), American activist and mayoral candidate
 Chris Whitten (born 1959), British session drummer
 C. W. Whitten (1871–1957), American educator and athletic administrator
 Danny Whitten (1943–1972), American musician and songwriter
 Deb Whitten (born 1966), Canadian field hockey player
 Don Whitten (born 1935), Australian rules footballer
 Frank Whitten (1942–2011), New Zealand television actor
 George Whitten (1922–2001), Australian politician
 Greg Whitten, American software architect
 Herbert Whitten (1909–1981), Northern Irish politician
 Ian Whitten (born 1987), Irish rugby union player
 Jack Whitten (born 1939), American abstract painter
 Jack Whitten (footballer) (1922–1980), Australian rules footballer 
 Jamie L. Whitten (1910–1995), American politician from Mississippi
 Jeffrey L. Whitten (born c. 1955), American computer scientist and professor
 John Whitten, (1920–2000), American Central Intelligence Agency officer
 Len Whitten, Canadian Anglican Bishop
 Les Whitten (born 1928), American investigative reporter and novelist
 Marguerite Whitten (1913—1990), American film actress
 Martha E. Whitten (1842–1917), American author
 Michelle Whitten, American non-profit executive director
Norman Whitten (1881–1969), British actor and film producer
 Tara Whitten (born 1980), Canadian track racing cyclist
 Ted Whitten (1933–1995), Australian rules footballer
 Ted Whitten, Jr. (born 1957), Australian rules footballer
 Tim Whitten, Australian record producer, audio engineer, and mixer
 Todd Whitten (born 1965), American football coach and player
 Tony Whitten (1953–2017), British conservationist
 Wesley Kingston Whitten (1918–2010), Australian reproductive biologist
 Wilfred Whitten (1864–1942), British writer and editor